Jinal Belani (also known as Jhinal Belani) is an Indian actress who primarily works in the Gujarati film industry. She is born and brought up in Mumbai, India.

Personal life

Jhinal did her graduation in Mass media from Mithibai College and then MA Literature through distance learning from Mumbai University. She was involved in theatre during her college days and did a Dove ad in 2012.  She then appeared in a series of ads like Doycare, Micromax, Hawkins, Roopsangam Sarees and Sahara Mineral Water to name a few.

Acting career
Jinal Belani made her TV debut as female lead in the Doordarshan show Laaga Chunri Mai Daag based on the Bollywood movie Fashion where she played the role of a small town girl aspiring to make it big in the movie industry. She was also the female lead in the Gujarati movie Polam Pol releasing on 12 February 2016. She will be seen playing south star Dhanush's bride in upcoming Bollywood film Nimmo. Produced by Anand L Rai (color yellow productions), film is directed by his assistant Rahul Shankalya.

She is also shooting for writer - director Vipul K.Rawal's untitled next. She is playing young college girl in this thriller. She also did two more Gujarati films in year 2017. Dhantyaopen and wassup zindagi, for both she received critical acclaim. She did gujarati web series "bas cha sudhi" season 2 & 3.

Filmography

Films

Television

Web series

References

External links 

Indian television actresses
Living people
1994 births
Mithibai College alumni